Amy Butler (born 1987) is a camogie player and an accountant, who played in the 2009 All Ireland camogie final. She collected a National League Division 1 title when Galway were defeated in the 2008 final. She also holds a Colleges Division 1 league medal from 2006. Her senior debut was in 2006.

References

External links 
 Official Camogie website
 Kilkenny Camogie website
 Review of 2009 championship in On The Ball official camogie magazine
 https://web.archive.org/web/20091228032101/http://www.rte.ie/sport/gaa/championship/gaa_fixtures_camogie_oduffycup.html Fixtures and results] for the 2009 O'Duffy Cup
 All-Ireland Senior Camogie Championship: Roll of Honour

1987 births
Living people
Kilkenny camogie players